George Cameron may refer to:

George Cameron (songwriter) (1768–1823), Tyneside hairdresser and songwriter
George Cameron (musician), founding member of the baroque rock vocal group the Left Banke
George Cameron (cyclist) (1881–1968), American Olympic cyclist
George Frederick Cameron (1854–1885), Canadian poet
George H. Cameron (1861–1944), United States Army Major General
George Cameron (priest) (1861–1940), English Archdeacon of Johannesburg